Abyssinian may refer to:

Cultures
 Abyssinian people and 
 Things related to parts of Ethiopia, formerly known as Abyssinia

Domestic animal breeds
 Abyssinian cat, a cat breed
 Abyssinian goat, a goat breed; see Rustica di Calabria
 Abyssinian guinea pig, a guinea pig (cavy) breed
 Abyssinian horse, a horse breed

Other uses
 The Abyssinian, a 1997 novel by Jean-Christophe Rufin
 The Abyssinians, a Jamaican roots reggae group

See also
 Abyssinian Meeting House, a historic church in Portland, Maine, USA
 Abyssinian black-and-white colobus, another name for the mantled guereza, a black-and-white colobus monkey
 Abyssinian roller, a bird that lives in tropical Africa
 Abyssinian siskin, a finch that lives in Ethiopia
 Abyssinian Campaign (disambiguation)
 Abyssinia (disambiguation)